Gheorghe Hapciuc (1910 – 1972) was a Romanian racing cyclist. He rode in the 1936 Tour de France.

References

1910 births
1972 deaths
Romanian male cyclists
Place of birth missing